Defending champion Jana Novotná and her partner Martina Hingis defeated the other defending champion Lindsay Davenport and her partner Natasha Zvereva in the final, 6–3, 6–3 to win the women's doubles tennis title at the 1998 US Open. With the win, Hingis became the third woman in the Open Era to complete a Grand Slam in doubles, after Martina Navratilova and Pam Shriver. Additionally, Hingis and her partners defeated Davenport/Zvereva in all four major finals in 1998.

Seeds

Qualifying draw

Draw

Finals

Top half

Section 1

Section 2

Bottom half

Section 3

Section 4

External links
1998 US Open – Women's draws and results at the International Tennis Federation

Women's Doubles
US Open (tennis) by year – Women's doubles
1998 in women's tennis
1998 in American women's sports